The 2022–23 Thai League 3 Northeastern region is a region in the regional stage of the 2022–23 Thai League 3. The tournament was sponsored by Kongsalak Plus, and known as the Kongsalak Plus League for sponsorship purposes. A total of 13 teams located in Northeastern of Thailand will compete in the league of the Northeastern region.

Teams

Number of teams by province

Stadiums and locations

Foreign players
A T3 team could register 3 foreign players from foreign players all around the world. A team can use 3 foreign players on the field in each game.
Note :: players who released during second leg transfer window;: players who registered during second leg transfer window.
{|class="unsortable"
|-
| style="width:15px; background:#ffdddd;"| ||Other foreign players.
|-
| style="width:15px; background:#ffffdd;"| ||AFC member countries players.
|-
| style="width:15px; background:#ddffdd;"| ||ASEAN member countries players.
|-
| style="width:15px; background:#c8ccd1;"| ||No foreign player registered.
|}

League table

Standings

Positions by round

Results by round

Results

Season statistics

Top scorers
As of 13 October 2022.

Hat-tricks 

Notes: (H) = Home team ; (A) = Away team

Clean sheets 
As of 24 September 2022.

Attendances

Overall statistical table

Attendances by home match played

Source: Thai League

References

External links
 Official website of Thai League

Thai League 3
3